VIZ Media LLC is an American entertainment company headquartered in San Francisco, California, focused on publishing manga, distribution and licensing Japanese anime, films, and television series. It was founded in 1986 as VIZ LLC. In 2005, VIZ LLC and ShoPro Entertainment merged to form the current VIZ Media LLC, which is owned by Japanese publishing conglomerates Shueisha and Shogakukan, as well as Japanese production company Shogakukan-Shueisha Productions (ShoPro). In 2017, Viz Media was the largest publisher of graphic novels in the United States, with a 23% share of the market. In 2020, Viz Media saw a 70% growth in the U.S. market, in line with a 43% increase in overall manga sales in the United States the same year.

Early history 

Seiji Horibuchi, originally from Tokushima Prefecture in Shikoku, Japan, moved to California, United States in 1975. After living in the suburbs for almost two years, he moved to San Francisco, where he started a business exporting American cultural items to Japan, and became a writer of cultural information. He also became interested in publishing Japanese manga in the United States, though he himself was not a fan of Japanese comics until a visit to Japan in 1985 exposed him to Katsuhiro Otomo's single-volume title Domu: A Child's Dream.  His idea came to fruition after he met Masahiro Ohga, then managing director of Shogakukan, in 1985 and shared his vision. Shogakukan provided Horibuchi with $200,000 in startup capital, which Horibuichi used in 1986 to found VIZ Communications.

VIZ Communications released its first titles in 1987, which included Legend of Kamui; however, sales were mediocre due to the specialist comic market being averse to venturing into new territory.  To counteract this problem, VIZ expanded into the general publishing business and began publishing various art related books in 1992.  Into these titles, Horibuchi began publishing manga, calling them graphic novels so they would be carried by mainstream bookstores. The plan worked, and after several years, leading booksellers began to have dedicated shelves for manga titles. Sales also picked up when VIZ Communications acquired the license for the comedy series Ranma ½, which became an instant hit.

The company continued to see success when it expanded into the anime distribution market, began publishing Shonen Jump, an English adaptation of the popular Japanese magazine Weekly Shōnen Jump. It also acquired another huge selling title, Inuyasha. In the late 1990s, VIZ began making the push to move into the European and South American markets.

Shueisha co-ownership and mergers: 2000 to present 
When Shueisha became a joint owner of Viz Media in 2002, both Shogakukan and Shueisha began to release manga exclusively through Viz. Shueisha's deal with Viz may have been prompted by competition with Raijin Comics, a rival manga publisher created in 2002 by editors and artists who had split off from Shueisha, taking their properties with them. Some exceptions to this exclusivity exist, however: Shueisha permitted DC Comics's subsidiary CMX Manga to license Tenjho Tenge (although it was later re-licensed and re-released by Viz Media) and Kamikaze Kaito Jeanne, permitted Dark Horse Comics to license Gantz, Lady Snowblood, Shadow Lady, The Monkey King, and recently Yasuhiro Nightow's Blood Blockade Battlefront and CLAMP's Gate 7. Shueisha also permitted Udon Entertainment to license The Rose of Versailles, Seven Seas Entertainment to license Hayate X Blade and will later permit Seven Seas Entertainment to license Yuuna and the Haunted Hot Springs and Super HxEros, and permitted Tokyopop to license Kodocha, Marmalade Boy and Digimon Next and Manga Planet to license Silver Fang -The Shooting Star Gin- and will allow Kodansha USA to license the Battle Angel Alita manga in America. Shogakukan permitted Tokyopop to license Corrector Yui (even though Viz Media licensed the anime) and Yumi Tsukirino's Stitch! manga (because Tokyopop had the rights to Disney), Seven Seas Entertainment to license Dai Dark and the Himitsu Sentai Gorenger manga, Udon Entertainment to license the Infini-T Force manga (even though Viz Media licensed the anime), the now-defunct ComicsOne to license Wounded Man - The White Haired Demon, permitted Dark Horse Comics to license Crying Freeman (even though it was previously licensed by Viz), New Lone Wolf and Cub (however, this is because Dark Horse has the original series), The Legend of Zelda: Skyward Sword and Mob Psycho 100, and permitted Hachette Book Group's subsidiary Yen Press to license Azumanga Daioh, Silver Spoon, Karakai Jōzu no Takagi-san, My Teen Romantic Comedy SNAFU and Cirque du Freak (however for Cirque du Freak, this is because their sister company publishes the original novels. For Azumanga Daioh, Yen Press's license of the manga was a month before Shogakukan reprinted the manga in May 2009, resulting in a change of license holders from ASCII Media Works (when Yen Press announced the license) to Shogakukan (when Yen Press released it). The Yen Press edition is a newly translated and lettered version of ADV Manga's edition (taken from ASCII Media Works) as opposed to the 3-volume edition by Shogakukan. Yen Press has expressed interest in releasing the 3-volume edition although editor Kurt Hassler said he is not "sure this will be possible.", possibly because Shogakukan owns Viz and that they almost exclusively license their titles to them). In March 2010, Shogakukan began a partnership with Fantagraphics Books to issue a line of manga to be edited by Matt Thorn. In 2003, possibly in response to Shogakukan and Shueisha's co-ownership of Viz, Japanese publisher Kodansha formed a co-venture with Del Rey.

In 2004, VIZ Communications was merged with ShoPro Entertainment, funding company Shogakukan's American distribution division. Horibuchi became the new company's chairman. In 2005, Horibuchi started a related division, Viz Pictures, for releasing selected live-action films in the US to theaters and DVD.

On December 17, 2008, Viz Media announced that starting on April 1, 2009, Warner Home Video would be handling the distribution of both its new and existing catalog releases. Viz itself is still the licensor and will do all production, while tapping the distribution powerhouse that distributes the works of other major companies such as BBC, National Geographic Channel, and Cartoon Network. Viz President and CEO Hidemi Fukuhara stated that he believes the partnership will help the company grow its anime holdings more effectively. Distribution was then transferred to Studio Distribution Services, LLC, a joint venture between WBHE and Universal Pictures Home Entertainment.

On February 20, 2009, Viz Media laid off an unknown number of employees in order to help be more streamlined to face the current economic climate. On May 11, 2010, Viz Media again laid off a number of workers, 60 this time, again in order to try to become more streamlined. This time they released a press release claiming that none of their current product lines would be affected.

On April 2, 2012, it was announced that the Senior Vice-President and General Manager of Viz Media Ken Sasaki would be succeeding executive producer Hidemi Fukuhara as President and CEO; Fukuhara will subsequently take up the position of Vice-President at the end of the month.

In Fall 2013, Viz began distributing titles to the Philippines. In 2014, it announced it would do the same in India with 75 Shueisha titles being released in that country; Viz titles had been distributed unofficially to that country prior to the announcement.

On July 3, 2019, Viz Media partnered with Crunchyroll to distribute select Crunchyroll licensed titles on home video and electronic sell-through in the United States and Canada.

On July 3, 2020, Funimation announced that they would begin streaming the original Naruto series on July 6. More content from Viz Media started to launch in their catalog such as Hunter × Hunter, Sailor Moon R: The Movie and two Berserk films.

On September 9, 2020, Funimation announced that they had reached a distribution partnership with Viz Media, with Viz Media titles being made available to stream on Funimation's website. The deal was made after select Viz titles were previously made available on Funimation.

Manga ratings 
In contrast to similar TV and film ratings, Viz also has set up certain "manga ratings" for their products based on their content.

A (ALL AGES): May be suitable for readers or consumers of any age. For example, may contain mild language and fantasy violence but no swearing or nudity.

T (TEEN): May be suitable for early teens and older. For example, may contain violence, infrequent use of strong language, suggestive themes or situations, crude humor, alcohol and/or tobacco use.

T+ (TEEN PLUS): May be suitable for older teens and adults. For example, may contain intense and/or gory violence, sexual content, frequent strong language, alcohol, tobacco and/or other substance use.

M (MATURE): Suitable for adults only. May contain extreme violence, mature themes and graphic depictions.

Despite its name, Viz's manga ratings were also used on licensed anime titles, though, in the later 2000s, they instead relied on local countries' rating systems.

Reception 
Viz Media was awarded the Manga Publisher of the Year Gem Award by Diamond Comic Distributors in 2007. VIZ continues to publish many titles, some of the most popular including: Dragon Ball, One Piece, Detective Conan (as Case Closed), Bleach, Inuyasha, and Naruto which results a high success of the company as well as a large amount of the North American readers.

Viz also received an award for Manga Trade Paperback of the Year for its release of the fourteenth volume of the Naruto series.

Publication style 
By 2002, Viz Communications kept some publications in the original right-to-left format, while in other publications it mirrored pages from Japan's right-to-left reading format to fit the Western left-to-right reading style. During that year Dallas Middaugh, the senior marketing manager of Viz, stated that the left-to-right version of Neon Genesis Evangelion outsold the right-to-left version of Neon Genesis Evangelion on a three to one basis; Middaugh concluded that readers wanted "an easy reading experience." Akira Toriyama, creator of Dragon Ball, requested that his work, which was separated by Viz into Dragon Ball and Dragon Ball Z, be published in the original right-to-left format. Vagabond was printed in right-to-left to preserve historical accuracy. Middaugh said that younger readers of Dragon Ball adapted to the right to left format more easily than their parents.

VIZ has censored some of its titles. Some titles, such as Dragon Ball, were published in both censored and uncensored forms.

Divisions

Viz Productions 

Based in Los Angeles, Viz Productions coordinates the licenses of Japanese material (manga, books, and film) to American film companies.  Their goal is to involve the Japanese creators in the production and facilitate communication between all parties in the US and Japan. VIZ Productions' first film is the live action adaptation of All You Need is Kill, Edge of Tomorrow, starring Tom Cruise and Emily Blunt. Their second production was the American live-action adaptation to the supernatural thriller manga series: Death Note, which was directed by Adam Wingard and starred Nat Wolff, as the film's lead.

Viz also has many partnerships with various authors and celebrities, perhaps the most famous being the cosplay film that debuted in the 2013 Tokyo Anime Festival with Kirata Uchiha, played by JadexRoyal. Winning multiple awards for the board including Masashi Kishimoto. Others include Full Moon, and Last Quarter.

Films 
 Edge of Tomorrow

Television 
 Seis Manos

New People 
In November 2005, New People was officially formed as a sister company for releasing live-action Japanese films as theatrical releases in selected markets called Viz Pictures.  According to Horibuchi, the company will focus on films that focus on the "Japanese 'kawaii (cute) and cool' pop culture." In 2007, the division released seven films to theaters, including Train Man: Densha Otoko and Honey and Clover. DVD releases for all VIZ Pictures films are distributed exclusively by its parent, VIZ Media. Viz Pictures renamed themselves to New People and no longer shares office space or employees with Viz Media.  Viz Media no longer distributes DVD and Blu-ray releases of their products.

Entertainment complex 
In August 2009, Viz Pictures (now known as New People and a separate entity from Viz Media) opened a three-story entertainment complex in San Francisco called New People. The center piece of the complex is a 143-seat movie theater that screens anime and Japanese live-action films.  The center also has a cafe, a store selling anime and manga related items, and clothing stores offering Japanese clothing items.

Neon Alley 

Neon Alley was a streaming service dedicated to anime and related programming established in October 2012. After moving streaming content from its own platform to Hulu, the branding would be retired in May 2016.

Publications

Animerica 

Animerica is a quarterly anime and manga digest that initially started as a monthly magazine featuring reviews of anime and manga titles, as well as related works. After a preview issue was released in November 1992, the magazine's first issue was released in February 1993 with a March 1993 cover date. The magazine originally featured articles and reviews on manga, anime, and related media, as well as manga preview chapters. In 1998, Animerica Extra was launched as a manga anthology that eventually focused specifically on shōjo titles. It was canceled in 2004.

VIZ changed the magazine's format in April 2005, with the new magazine really being two free publications of the same name. One is advertising-oriented and created specially for distribution at anime and manga conventions while the other is more general in scope and distributed through retail stores. Both versions have fewer and briefer articles and a lower page count. The last monthly issue of the original format Animerica had a cover date of June 2005 (Volume 13, No. 6).

Animurica was one of the first professional anime and manga magazines released in the United States, and one of the most popular in the 1990s. In 2004, it had a circulation of 45,000 readers, but low sales and high competition from Newtype USA resulted in the essential cancellation of the original magazine and its reformatting as a free digest.

Game On! USA 

Game On! USA was a monthly magazine that focused primarily on Japanese-developed video games, with an emphasis on the import scene. It served as the American counterpart to Shogakukan's Game On! magazine. It was published in May 1996 and ran for 7 monthly issues before being discontinued that same year in November. The magazine had news and reviews and other articles about classic fighting games like Street Fighter, Samurai Shodown and Virtua Fighter. Two video game-based manga series, Super Street Fighter II: Cammy by Masahiko Nakahira, and Samurai Shodown by Kyoichi Nanatsuki and Yuki Miyoshi, were serialized in the magazine. A one shot story based on Battle Arena Toshinden, illustrated by the game's character designer Tsukasa Kotobuki was published in the magazine as well.

Manga Vizion 

Manga Vizion, sometimes misspelled Manga Vision, is a manga anthology introduced by VIZ in 1995. It is believed to be the first manga anthology published in the United States. The premiere issue was dated March 1995 and featured three series: The Tragedy of P, Samurai Crusader: The Kumomaru Chronicles, and Ogre Slayer. It ran for four years until it was canceled in 1999.

Pulp 

Pulp was a monthly manga anthology introduced by Viz in 1997. The magazine featured more mature titles, marketed at adults rather than teenage readers. Some of titles serialized in the magazine included: Uzumaki, Banana Fish, and Dance Till Tomorrow. The magazine was canceled in 2002.

Shonen Jump 

Shonen Jump is a shōnen manga anthology that debuted in November 2002, with a January 2003 cover date. Based on the popular Japanese anthology Weekly Shōnen Jump, published by Shueisha, Shonen Jump is retooled for English readers and the American audience and is published monthly, instead of weekly. It features serialized chapters from seven manga series, and articles on Japanese language and culture, as well as manga, anime, video games, and figurines. In conjunction with the magazine, Viz launched new imprints for releasing media related to the series presented in the magazine, and other shōnen works. This includes two new manga imprints, an anime DVD imprint, a fiction line for releasing light novels, a label for fan and data books, and a label for the release of art books.

Prior to the magazine's launch, Viz launched an extensive marketing campaign to promote the magazine and help it succeed where other manga anthologies in North America have failed. Shueisha purchased an equity interest in Viz to help fund the venture, and Cartoon Network, Suncoast, and Diamond Distributors became promotional partners in the magazine. The first issue required three printings to meet demand, with over 300,000 copies sold. It was awarded the ICv2 "Comic Product of the Year" award in December 2002, and has continued to enjoy high sales with a monthly circulation of 215,000 in 2008.

Shojo Beat 

Shojo Beat was a shōjo manga magazine Viz launched in June 2005 as a sister magazine for Shonen Jump. It featured serialized chapters from six manga series as well as articles on Japanese culture, manga, anime, fashion and beauty. Viz launched related "Shojo Beat" imprints in its manga, light novel, and anime divisions to coordinate with the magazine's contents.

Targeted at women ages 16–18, the first issue of Shojo Beat launched with a circulation of 20,000 copies. By 2007, average circulation was approximately 38,000 copies. Half of its circulation came from subscriptions rather than store sales. In May 2009, the magazine was discontinued after 49 issues, with the July 2009 issue being the last released. Viz stated the "difficult economic climate" was behind the magazine's cancellation, and that it would continue releasing the magazine's titles, as well as others, using the "Shojo Beat" imprint.

Haikasoru 
In January 2009, Viz Media announced plans to launch a Japanese science fiction novel line called Haikasoru. The first novels were scheduled to be released in the summer of the same year, with four novels: The Lord of the Sands of Time by Issui Ogawa, ZOO by Otsuichi, All You Need Is Kill by Hiroshi Sakurazaka, and Usurper of the Sun by Hōsuke Nojiri. In addition, the imprint released an expanded edition of Kōshun Takami's Battle Royale. In 2010, the imprint release Project Itoh's novel Harmony, which later won a Special Citation Philip K. Dick Award. The imprint is distributed to trade by Simon & Schuster.

SuBLime

In October 2011, Viz Media launched SuBLime as an imprint for  titles. The imprint was formed in collaboration with the Japanese yaoi publisher Libre and its parent company Animate to publish English-language yaoi manga for the print and worldwide digital market. Although the first slate of books announced under SuBLime are Libre titles, the imprint will potentially offer titles from other Japanese publishers in the future. During FujoCon in July 2020, Viz Media stated that SuBLime had only been partnered with Animate for the first three years after the imprint's initial launch and are currently not partnered with them.

Business partnerships 

In March 2016, Viz Media announced that they are collaborating with United Talent Agency on their live action projects based on anime series. On July 3, 2019, Viz Media announced that they had partnered with Crunchyroll to distribute select Crunchyroll licensed titles on home video and electronic sell-through in the United States and Canada, as well as stream selected Viz Media titles on Crunchyroll.

Titles

Manga

Currently licensed

Viz Originals 
 BETWIXT †
 Devil's Candy †
 Fangirl †
 The Girl That Can't Get a Girlfriend †
 I'm the Grim Reaper †
 Star Wars: The Mandalorian - The Manga †
 World Piece †

Viz Media 
 07-Ghost
 After Hours
 Animal Crossing New Horizons: Deserted Island Diary
 BakéGyamon
 The Children Nowadays
 Deadman Wonderland
 Detroit Metal City
 Dinosaur Hour
 Dogs
 Excel Saga
 Firefighter! Daigo of Fire Company M
 Flame of Recca
 Fluffy Fluffy Cinnamoroll
 Fullmetal Alchemist †††
 Gestalt
 Happy Happy Clover
 Homestuck
 How Do We Relationship? †
 Ikigami: The Ultimate Limit
 Jormungand 
 Kirby Manga Mania †
 The Law of Ueki
 Leave it to PET!
 The Legend of Zelda †
 The Legend of Zelda: Twilight Princess †
 Little Battlers Experience
 Love's in Sight! †
 Loveless †
 MÄR
 Marvel × Shōnen Jump+ Super Collaboration
 Deadpool: Samurai 
 Secret Reverse 
 MegaMan NT Warrior
 Neon Genesis Evangelion
 Nightmare Inspector: Yumekui Kenbun †††
 O-Parts Hunter †††
 One-pound Gospel
 Persona 5 (manga) †
 Pokémon †
 Pokémon Adventures †
 Pokémon Diamond and Pearl Adventure!
 Pokémon Mystery Dungeon: Ginji's Rescue Team
 Portus
 Radiant †
 The Record of a Fallen Vampire †††
 Record of Grancrest War
 Requiem of the Rose King †
 Sexy Voice and Robo
 Spider-Man: Fake Red †
 Splatoon †
 Splatoon: Squid Kids Comedy Show †
 Star Wars: Guardians of the Whills
 Star Wars: The High Republic – The Edge of Balance †
 Star Wars: The Legends of Luke Skywalker
 Super Mario Adventures
 Switch
 That Blue Sky Feeling
 Tiger & Bunny
 Transformers: The Manga
 A Tropical Fish Yearns for Snow
 Turning Red: 4*Town 4*Real †
 Tuxedo Gin
 Video Girl Ai
 Wolf's Rain
 Wolverine: Snikt! †
 X
 Yo-kai Watch †

Shojo Beat 
 A Devil and Her Love Song
 Absolute Boyfriend
 Ai Ore!
 Aishiteruze Baby
 Alice 19th
 An Incurable Case of Love
 Angel Sanctuary
 Anonymous Noise
 Ao Haru Ride
 Baby and Me
 Backstage Prince
 Banana Fish
 Basara
 Beast Master
 Beauty is the Beast
 Beauty Pop
 Behind the Scenes!!
 Black Bird
 Blank Slate
 Bloody Mary
 Boys Over Flowers
 Boys Over Flowers Season 2
 Butterflies, Flowers
 Cactus's Secret
 Captive Hearts
 Ceres, Celestial Legend
 Crown of Love
 Crown of Thorns
 Dawn of the Arcana
 Daytime Shooting Star
 Demon Love Spell
 The Demon Prince of Momochi House
 Dengeki Daisy
 Descendants of Darkness ††
 Dolls
 Doubt!!
 The Earl and the Fairy
 Earl Cain
 Everyone's Getting Married
 Fairy Cube
 Fall in Love Like a Comic!
 Flower in a Storm
 From Far Away
 Full Moon o Sagashite
 Fushigi Yûgi
 Fushigi Yûgi: Byakko Senki †
 Fushigi Yûgi: Genbu Kaiden
 Gaba Kawa
 The Gentlemen's Alliance Cross
 Godchild
 Grand Guignol Orchestra
 Hana-Kimi
 Happy Hustle High
 Happy Marriage!?
 Heaven's Will
 The Heiress and the Chauffeur
 Here is Greenwood
 High School Debut
 Honey and Clover
 Honey Blood
 Honey Hunt
 Honey So Sweet
 Hot Gimmick
 Idol Dreams †
 I.O.N
 Ima Koi: Now I'm in Love †
 Imadoki!
 Jiu Jiu
 Kakuriyo: Bed and Breakfast for Spirits †
 Kamikaze Girls
 Kamisama Kiss
 Kare First Love
 Kaze Hikaru †
 Kenka Bancho Otome: Girl Beats Boys
 Kimi ni Todoke
 The King's Beast †
 Kiss of the Rose Princess
 Komomo Confiserie
 La Corda d'Oro
 Library Wars
 Like a Butterfly †
 Love Com
 Love Me, Love Me Not
 The Magic Touch
 Maid Sama!
 MeruPuri
 Meteor Prince 
 Midnight Secretary
 Millennium Snow
 Mistress Fortune
 Mixed Vegetables
 Monkey High!
 My Love Mix-Up! †
 My Love Story!!
 My Special One †
 Nana
 Natsume's Book of Friends †
 Neighborhood Story †
 Not Your Idol †
 Oresama Teacher
 Otomen
 Ouran High School Host Club
 Phantom Thief Jeanne
 Please Save My Earth
 Prince Freya †
 Punch!
 QQ Sweeper
 Queen's Quality †
 Rainbow Days †
 Rasetsu
 Red River
 Revolutionary Girl Utena
 Revolutionary Girl Utena: After the Revolution
 Romantic Killer †
 Rosen Blood †
 S · A: Special A
 Sakura Hime: The Legend of Princess Sakura
 Sakura, Saku †
 Sand Chronicles
 Seiho Boys' High School!
 Short-Tempered Melancholic
 Shortcake Cake
 Shuriken and Pleats
 Skip Beat! †
 Snow White with the Red Hair †
 So Cute it Hurts!!
 SP Baby
 Spell of Desire
 St. Dragon Girl
 Stepping on Roses
 The Story of Saiunkoku
 Strobe Edge
 Sugar Princess 
 Sweet Rein
 Tail of the Moon
 Takane and Hana
 Tamon's B-Side †
 Time Stranger Kyoko
 Tokyo Boys & Girls
 Ultra Maniac
 Vampire Knight
 Vampire Knight Memories †
 Voice Over! Seiyu Academy
 W Juliet
 Wanted
 The Water Dragon's Bride
 We Were There
 Wild Ones
 Wolf Girl and Black Prince †
 Yakuza Lover †
 Yona of the Dawn †
 The Young Master's Revenge
 Yukarism 
 Yume Kira Dream Shoppe
 Yurara

Shonen Jump 
 7thGarden †
 Agravity Boys
 Akane-banashi †
 Akira Toriyama's Manga Theater
 Aliens Area
 All You Need Is Kill
 Assassination Classroom
 Astra Lost in Space
 Ayashimon †
 Bakuman
 Barrage
 Beast Children
 Beat & Motion †
 Black Cat
 Black Clover †
 Black Torch
 Blade of the Moon Princess †
 Bleach
 Blue Box †
 Blue Exorcist †
 Bobobo-bo Bo-bobo ††
 Bone Collection
 Boruto: Naruto Next Generations †
 Build King
 Burn the Witch †
 Buso Renkin
 Candy Flurry
 Chainsaw Man †
 Cipher Academy †
 Claymore
 The Comiq
 Cowa!
 Cross Manage
 D.Gray-man †
 Dandadan †
 Dark Gathering †
 Death Note
 Demon Slayer: Kimetsu no Yaiba
 Demon Slayer: Kimetsu Academy †
 Doron Dororon
 Double Taisei
 Dr. Slump
 Dr. Stone †
 Dr. Stone Reboot: Byakuya
 Dragon Ball
 Dragon Ball Super †
 Dragon Quest: The Adventure of Dai †
 Earthchild
 The Elusive Samurai †
 Eyeshield 21
 Food Wars!
 Genkaku Picasso
 Ghost Reaper Girl †
 Gin Tama ††
 Ginka & Glüna †
 Gokurakugai †
 Guardian of the Witch
 Gun Blaze West
 Haikyu!!
 Hard-Boiled Cop and Dolphin
 Heart Gear †
 Hell Warden Higuma
 Hi-Fi Cluster
 High School Family: Kokosei Kazoku
 Hikaru no Go
 Hoshin Engi
 Hunter × Hunter †
 The Hunters Guild: Red Hood †
 I"s
 I'm From Japan
 i tell c
 The Ichinose Family's Deadly Sins †
 Jaco the Galactic Patrolman
 JoJo's Bizarre Adventure †
 Jujutsu Kaisen †
 Jujutsu Kaisen 0
 Juni Taisen: Zodiac War
 Just Listen to the Song
 Kaguya-sama: Love Is War †
 Kaiju No. 8 †
 Kaiu Shirai x Posuka Demizu: Beyond The Promised Neverland
 Knights of the Zodiac
 Kubo Won't Let Me Be Invisible †
 Kuroko's Basketball
 The Last Saiyuki
 Love Rush!
 Magu-chan: God of Destruction
 Mashle: Magic and Muscles †
 Me & Roboco †
 Mission: Yozakura Family †
 Mitama Security: Spirit Busters
 Moriarty the Patriot †
 Moriking
 Muhyo & Roji's Bureau of Supernatural Investigation
 My Hero Academia †
 My Hero Academia: Smash!!
 My Hero Academia: Team-Up Missions †
 My Hero Academia: Vigilantes †
 Naruto
 Naruto: Chibi Sasuke's Sharingan Legend
 Naruto: The Seventh Hokage and the Scarlet Spring
 ne0;lation
 Neru: Way of the Martial Artist
 Nine Dragons' Ball Parade
 Nisekoi: False Love
 Nora: The Last Chronicle of Devildom
 Nura: Rise of the Yokai Clan
 One Piece †
 One-Punch Man †
 Our Blood Oath
 Phantom Seer
 Platinum End
 PPPPPP
 Pretty Face
 The Prince of Tennis
 The Promised Neverland
 Protect Me, Shugomaru!
 Psyren
 Ral Grad
 Red Sprite
 The Right Way to Make Jump!
 Robot x LaserBeam
 Rosario + Vampire
 Rosario + Vampire: Season II
 RuriDragon †
 Rurouni Kenshin
 Rurouni Kenshin: Restoration
 Sakamoto Days †
 Samurai 8: The Tale of Hachimaru
 Sand Land
 School Judgment: Gakkyu Hotei
 Seraph of the End †
 Show-ha Shoten! †
 Slam Dunk
 Spy × Family †
 Stealth Symphony
 Super Smartphone
 Takama-ga-hara
 Takopi's Original Sin †
 Tatsuki Fujimoto Before Chainsaw Man: 17–21 and 22–26 †
 Teenage Renaissance! David
 Tegami Bachi
 Thus Spoke Kishibe Rohan †
 Time Killers
 Time Paradox Ghostwriter
 Tista †
 Tokyo Demon Bride Story †
 Tokyo Shinobi Squad
 Toriko
 Twin Star Exorcists †
 Ultimate Muscle
 Undead Unluck †
 Wāqwāq
 We Never Learn
 Whistle!
 Witch Watch †
 World Trigger †
 Yu-Gi-Oh!
 Yu-Gi-Oh! 5D's
 Yu-Gi-Oh! Arc-V
 Yu-Gi-Oh! Duelist
 Yu-Gi-Oh! GX
 Yu-Gi-Oh! Millennium World
 Yu-Gi-Oh! R
 Yu-Gi-Oh! Zexal
 Yui Kamio Lets Loose
 Zipman!!
 Zombiepowder.

Shonen Sunday 
 Arata: The Legend †
 Call of the Night †
 Case Closed †
 Cross Game
 Fly Me to the Moon †
 Frieren: Beyond Journey's End †
 Hayate the Combat Butler †
 Helck †
 Hyde & Closer
 Inuyasha
 Itsuwaribito
 Kekkaishi
 Komi Can't Communicate †
 Kurozakuro
 Magi: The Labyrinth of Magic
 Mao †
 Maoh: Juvenile Remix
 Ranma ½
 Rin-ne
 Sleepy Princess in the Demon Castle †
 Yakitate!! Japan
 Yashahime: Princess Half-Demon †

Studio Ghibli Library 
 Baron: The Cat Returns
 Castle in the Sky (film comic)
 Howl's Moving Castle (film comic)
 Kiki's Delivery Service (film comic)
 My Neighbor Totoro (film comic)
 Nausicaä of the Valley of the Wind
 Ponyo (film comic)
 Princess Mononoke (film comic)
 Spirited Away (film comic)
 The Secret World of Arrietty (film comic)

Viz Select 
 AiON ††
 Calling You
 Chibi Vampire
 Chocolate Cosmos
 Clamp School Detectives
 Crazy For You
 D.N.Angel ††
 Duklyon: Clamp School Defenders
 Eureka Seven
 Fate/stay night ††
 Flower of the Deep Sleep
 Future Diary ††
 The Girl Who Leapt Through Time
 Girls Bravo
 Glass Wings
 Goth
 Grenadier
 Guardian Hearts ††
 Hanako and the Terror of Allegory
 Hands Off!
 Haru Hana
 Hibiki's Magic ††
 Judas
 Kamiyadori
 Kannazuki no Miko
 Kyo Kara Maoh! ††
 Lagoon Engine
 Lucky Star ††
 Mad Love Chase
 Man of Many Faces
 Metamo Kiss
 Mikansei No. 1
 Million Tears
 Miyuki-chan in Wonderland
 Momogumi Plus Senki ††
 Mouryou Kiden
 The One I Love
 Ratman ††
 Red Hot Chili Samurai ††
 Rizelmine
 Saber Marionette J
 Samurai Girl: Real Bout High School
 Saving Life ††
 Sgt. Frog ††
 Shirahime-Syo
 Someday's Dreamers
 St. Lunatic High School
 Suki: A Like Story
 The Third
 Trinity Blood
 Welcome to the N.H.K.
 ZONE-00 ††
 Zyword

Viz Signature 
 20th Century Boys
 21st Century Boys
 Abara
 Afterschool Charisma
 Alice in Borderland †
 All My Darling Daughters
 Asadora! †
 Assassin's Creed: Blade of Shao Jun
 Battle Royale: Angels' Border
 Beastars
 Beast Complex †
 Biomega
 Black Lagoon †
 Black Paradox
 Blue Flag
 Bokurano: Ours
 Boy's Abyss †
 Came the Mirror & Other Tales
 Cat Eyed Boy †
 Cats of the Louvre
 Children of the Sea
 Children of the Whales †
 Choujin X †
 Crazy Food Truck †
 Dead Dead Demon's Dededede Destruction †
 Deserter: Junji Ito Story Collection
 Dorohedoro
 Downfall
 #DRCL midnight children †
 The Drifting Classroom
 Drip Drip
 Fire Punch
 Fist of the North Star †
 Fragments of Horror
 Frankenstein: Junji Ito Story Collection
 Gangsta †
 Gangsta: Cursed
 Gente
 GoGo Monster
 Golden Kamuy †
 Golgo 13 ††
 Goodbye, Eri †
 Goodnight Punpun
 Gyo
 Hell's Paradise: Jigokuraku
 House of Five Leaves
 I'll Give It My All... Tomorrow
 Insomniacs After School †
 The Kingdom of the Gods
 Kingyo Used Books ††
 La Quinta Camera
 Levius
 Levius/est
 The Liminal Zone
 Look Back
 Lovesickness: Junji Ito Story Collection
 Maison Ikkoku
 March Story
 Master Keaton
 Mermaid Saga
 Mermaid Scales and the Town of Sand
 Mimi's Tales of Terror †
 Mobile Suit Gundam Thunderbolt †
 Monster
 Mujirushi: The Sign of Dreams
 No Guns Life
 No Longer Human
 No. 5
 Not Simple
 Oishinbo ††
 Ōoku: The Inner Chambers
 Orochi †
 Phoenix
 Ping Pong
 Pluto
 Ran and the Gray World
 Real †
 Record of Ragnarok †
 Remina
 Ristorante Paradiso
 Rooster Fighter †
 RWBY
 Saturn Apartments
 Sensor
 Shiver: Junji Ito Selected Stories
 Smashed: Junji Ito Story Collection
 Sneeze: Naoki Urasawa Story Collection
 Soichi: Junji Ito Story Collection †
 Solanin
 Sunny
 Sweet Blue Flowers
 Tekkonkinkreet
 Tenjo Tenge
 Terra Formars †
 Tesoro
 To Strip the Flesh
 Tokyo Ghoul
 Tokyo Ghoul:re
 Tombs: Junji Ito Story Collection †
 Tomie
 Ultraman †
 Until I Love Myself: The Journey of a Nonbinary Manga Artist †
 Urusei Yatsura †
 Uzumaki
 Vagabond †
 Venus in the Blind Spot
 The Way of the Househusband †
 What a Wonderful World!
 Will I Be Single Forever?
 Zom 100: Bucket List of the Dead †

† - New volumes currently being released

†† - Series not published in its entirety

††† - Yen Press has the rights to series' digital release due to being a Square Enix title.

Formerly licensed 

 2001 Nights
 A, A Prime
 A.D. Police: Dead End City
 Act-Age (rescinded)
 Adolf (now licensed by Vertical)
 The All-New Tenchi Muyo!
 Aqua Knight
 Area 88 ††
 Ashen Victor
 Ayakashi Triangle (new chapters are released on the Shonen Jump app, volumes are licensed by Seven Seas Entertainment) ††
 B.B. Explosion
 B.O.D.Y. ††
 Baoh
 Bastard!! ††
 Battle Angel Alita (now licensed by Kodansha USA)
 Battle Angel Alita: Last Order (now licensed by Kodansha USA) ††
 Beet the Vandel Buster ††
 Benkei in New York
 Beyblade
 The Big O
 Bio Booster Armor Guyver ††
 Black Jack (now licensed by Vertical) ††
 Black Rose Alice ††
 Blood: The Last Vampire
 Blue Spring
 Cheeky Angel
 Chicago
 ChocoMimi ††
 Cobra ††
 Crimson Hero ††
 Crying Freeman (now licensed by Dark Horse Comics)
 Dance till Tomorrow
 Di Gi Charat
 Dinosaur King
 Doraemon
 Dragon Drive
 Eagle: The Making of an Asian-American President
 Eat-Man ††
 El-Hazard
 Flowers & Bees
 Galaxy Express 999
 Getter Robo Go
 Ghost in the Shell 2: Innocence (film comic)
 Gimmick!
 Grey
 Haou Airen
 Haruka: Beyond the Stream of Time
 Inubaka: Crazy for Dogs ††
 Kurohime ††
 The Legend of Kamui ††
 Legendz
 Macross II
 Magical Pokémon Journey ††
 Mai, the Psychic Girl
 Marionette Generation
 Medabots
 Midori Days
 Mobile Police Patlabor ††
 Mobile Suit Gundam 0079 ††
 Mobile Suit Gundam Wing
 Mobile Suit Gundam: The Origin (now licensed by Vertical) ††
 Monster Hunter: Flash Hunter
 Neko Majin ††
 No Need for Tenchi
 Ogre Slayer ††
 Pineapple Army ††
 Pokémon: The Electric Tale of Pikachu
 Project ARMS
 RahXephon
 Read or Die
 Read or Dream
 Reborn! ††
 Resident Evil: The Marhawa Desire
 Rumic Theater ††
 Rumic World ††
 Rurouni Kenshin: The Hokkaido Arc (rescinded)
 Saikano
 Samurai Crusader
 Sanctuary
 Sensual Phrase
 Shakugan no Shana ††
 Shaman King (now licensed by Kodansha USA)
 Short Cuts
 Short Program
 Silent Möbius (now licensed by Udon Entertainment)
 Socrates in Love
 SOS
 Spriggan (now licensed by Seven Seas Entertainment) ††
 Steam Detectives
 Strain
 Strawberry 100% ††
 They Were Eleven (now licensed by Denpa)
 Times Two
 Togari
 Tough ††
 Train Man: Densha Otoko
 Ultimo
 Voyeur ††
 Wedding Peach
 Wild Com.
 Wish
 Xenon
 Zatch Bell! ††
 Zoids: Chaotic Century
 Zoids: New Century

†† - Series not published in its entirety

Anime

Currently licensed 

 Accel World
 Accel World: Infinite Burst (film)
 Bakuman (originally licensed by Media Blasters) †
 Berserk: The Golden Age Arc I: The Egg of the King (film)
 Berserk: The Golden Age Arc II - The Battle for Doldrey (film)
 Berserk: The Golden Age Arc III - The Advent (film)
 Blame! (film) ††
 Bleach
 Bleach: Memories of Nobody (film)
 Bleach: The DiamondDust Rebellion (film)
 Bleach: Fade to Black (film)
 Bleach: Hell Verse (film)
 Blue Dragon
 Blue Dragon: Trials of the Seven Shadows
 Blood Lad
 Boruto: Naruto Next Generations
 Burn the Witch (film) ††
 Buso Renkin
 Captain Tsubasa (2018) †
 Castlevania ††
 Coppelion
 Death Note
 Doraemon †
 Gargantia on the Verdurous Planet
 The Genie Family (2020) †
 The God of High School ††
 Hikaru no Go
 Hunter × Hunter (2011)
 Hunter × Hunter: Phantom Rouge (film)
 Hunter × Hunter: The Last Mission (film)
 In/Spectre ††
 Infini-T Force
 Infini-T Force the Movie: Farewell, Friend
 Inuyasha
 Inuyasha: The Final Act
 Inuyasha the Movie: Affections Touching Across Time (film)
 Inuyasha the Movie: The Castle Beyond the Looking Glass (film)
 Inuyasha the Movie: Swords of an Honorable Ruler (film)
 Inuyasha the Movie: Fire on the Mystic Island (film)
 JoJo's Bizarre Adventure (originally licensed by Warner Bros.)
 JoJo's Bizarre Adventure: Stardust Crusaders
 JoJo's Bizarre Adventure: Diamond Is Unbreakable
 JoJo's Bizarre Adventure: Golden Wind
 Jujutsu Kaisen ††
 K
 K: Missing Kings (film) 
 K: Return of Kings
 K: Seven Stories (film)
 Levius ††
 Mazinger Z: Infinity (film)
 Megalobox (first season only)
 Mr. Osomatsu (first and second seasons only)
 Naruto
 Naruto the Movie: Ninja Clash in the Land of Snow (film)
 Naruto the Movie: Legend of the Stone of Gelel (film)
 Naruto the Movie: Guardians of the Crescent Moon Kingdom (film)
 Naruto: Shippuden
 Naruto Shippuden the Movie (film)
 Naruto Shippuden the Movie 2: Bonds (film)
 Naruto Shippuden the Movie 3: The Will of Fire (film)
 Naruto Shippuden the Movie: The Lost Tower (film)
 Naruto the Movie: Blood Prison (film)
 Road to Ninja: Naruto the Movie (film)
 The Last: Naruto the Movie (film)
 Boruto: Naruto the Movie (film)
 Naruto SD: Rock Lee and his Ninja Pals
 Nura: Rise of the Yokai Clan
 Nura: Rise of the Yokai Clan - Demon Capital
 One-Punch Man
 Pokémon: The Series
 Pokémon: Indigo League ††
 Pokémon: Adventures on the Orange Islands ††
 Pokémon: The Johto Journeys ††
 Pokémon: Johto League Champions ††
 Pokémon: Master Quest ††
 Pokémon: Advanced ††
 Pokémon: Advanced Challenge ††
 Pokémon: Advanced Battle ††
 Pokémon: Battle Frontier ††
 Pokémon: Diamond and Pearl ††
 Pokémon: Diamond and Pearl: Battle Dimension ††
 Pokémon: Diamond and Pearl: Galactic Battles ††
 Pokémon: Diamond and Pearl: Sinnoh League Victors ††
 Pokémon: Black & White ††
 Pokémon: Black & White: Rival Destinies ††
 Pokémon: Black & White: Adventures in Unova ††
 Pokémon: Black & White: Adventures in Unova and Beyond ††
 Pokémon the Series: XY ††
 Pokémon the Series: XY Kalos Quest ††
 Pokémon the Series: XYZ ††
 Pokémon the Series: Sun & Moon ††
 Pokémon the Series: Sun & Moon – Ultra Adventures ††
 Pokémon the Series: Sun & Moon – Ultra Legends †† 
 Pokémon Journeys: The Series ††
 Pokémon Master Journeys: The Series ††
 Pokémon: The Movie
 Pokémon: The First Movie (film; also licensed by Kids' WB) ††
 Pokémon: The Movie 2000 (film; also licensed by Kids' WB) ††
 Pokémon 3: The Movie (film; also licensed by Kids' WB) ††
 Pokémon: Lucario and the Mystery of Mew (film) ††
 Pokémon Ranger and the Temple of the Sea (film) ††
 Pokémon: The Rise of Darkrai (film) ††
 Pokémon: Giratina & the Sky Warrior (film; originally licensed by Universal Studios Home Entertainment) ††
 Pokémon: Arceus and the Jewel of Life (film) ††
 Pokémon: Zoroark: Master of Illusions (film) ††
 Pokémon the Movie: Black—Victini and Reshiram (film) ††
 Pokémon the Movie: White—Victini and Zekrom (film) ††
 Pokémon the Movie: Kyurem vs. the Sword of Justice (film) ††
 Pokémon the Movie: Genesect and the Legend Awakened (film) ††
 Pokémon the Movie: Diancie and the Cocoon of Destruction (film) ††
 Pokémon the Movie: Hoopa and the Clash of Ages (film) ††
 Pokémon the Movie: Volcanion and the Mechanical Marvel (film) ††
 Pokémon the Movie: I Choose You! (film) ††
 Pokémon the Movie: The Power of Us (film) ††
 Pokémon: Mewtwo Strikes Back—Evolution (film) ††
 Pokémon the Movie: Secrets of the Jungle (film) ††
 Ranma ½
 Ranma ½: Big Trouble in Nekonron, China (film)
 Ranma ½: Nihao My Concubine (film)
 Reborn! (streaming only; Discotek Media has the home video rights)
 Record of Ragnarok ††
 Sailor Moon (The first two seasons were originally licensed by DIC Entertainment and ADV Films, while the third and fourth seasons were originally licensed by Cloverway Inc. and Pioneer Entertainment)
 Sailor Moon Crystal 
 Sailor Moon R: The Movie (film; originally licensed by Pioneer Entertainment)
 Sailor Moon S: The Movie (film; originally licensed by Pioneer Entertainment)
 Sailor Moon SuperS: The Movie (film; originally licensed by Pioneer Entertainment)
 Terra Formars
 Terra Formars: Revenge
 Tiger & Bunny (first season only)
 Tiger & Bunny: The Beginning (film)
 Tiger & Bunny: The Rising (film)
 Tower of God ††
 Vampire Knight
 Vampire Knight: Guilty
 Yashahime: Princess Half-Demon
 Zetman
 Zom 100: Bucket List of the Dead †

† - Not currently dubbed or released outside of streaming

†† - Viz only has home video rights

Formerly licensed 

 Adieu Galaxy Express 999 (film; now licensed by Discotek Media)
 Boys Over Flowers (now licensed by Discotek Media)
 Ceres, Celestial Legend (now licensed by Discotek Media)
 Corrector Yui
 Cross Game (streaming only)
 Deko Boko Friends
 Eyeshield 21 (now licensed by Sentai Filmworks)
 Fatal Fury: Legend of the Hungry Wolf (film; now licensed by Discotek Media)
 Fatal Fury: The Motion Picture (film; now licensed by Discotek Media)
 Fatal Fury 2: The New Battle (film; now licensed by Discotek Media)
 Flame of Recca (now licensed by Discotek Media)
 Full Moon o Sagashite
 Galaxy Express 999 (film; now licensed by Discotek Media)
 Grandpa Danger
 Great Dangaioh
 Grey: Digital Target
 Hamtaro
 Honey and Clover (now licensed by Discotek Media)
 Honey and Clover II (now licensed by Discotek Media)
 Hunter × Hunter (1999)
 I"s
 I"s Pure
 Jin-Roh (film; with Bandai Entertainment, now licensed by Discotek Media)
 Kekkaishi (now licensed by Discotek Media)
 Key the Metal Idol (now licensed by Discotek Media)
 Lagrange: The Flower of Rin-ne
 Maison Ikkoku
 MÄR (First 52 episodes only)
 MegaMan NT Warrior (First and Second (Axess) season only)
 Mega Man Star Force (First 13 episodes only)
 Mermaid's Scar
 Mirmo!
 Monster
 Moribito: Guardian of the Spirit (now licensed by Sentai Filmworks, originally licensed by Geneon and later by Media Blasters)
 Nana (now licensed by Sentai Filmworks)
 Neuro: Supernatural Detective (streaming only)
 Night Warriors: Darkstalkers' Revenge (now licensed by Discotek Media)
 Ogre Slayer
 One-pound Gospel
 Please Save My Earth
 The Prince of Tennis (First 50 episodes only; now licensed by Crunchyroll)
 Professor Layton and the Eternal Diva (film)
 Project ARMS (now licensed by Discotek Media)
 Saikano (now licensed by Sentai Filmworks)
 Sanctuary
 Strawberry 100% (streaming only)
 Trouble Chocolate
 Ultra Maniac (Originally licensed by Geneon, now licensed by Discotek Media)
 Video Girl Ai
 Zatch Bell! (First 104 episodes only; now licensed by New Video)
 Zoids: Chaotic Century
 Zoids: Genesis

Live-action films

Previously distributed 

 20th Century Boys: Beginning of the End
 20th Century Boys 2: The Last Hope
 20th Century Boys 3: Redemption
 Death Note (now licensed by Crunchyroll)
 Death Note 2: The Last Name (now licensed by Crunchyroll)
 Densha Otoko
 Detroit Metal City
 Funky Forest: The First Contact
 Honey and Clover
 Kamikaze Girls
 L: Change the World
 Love*Com
 Nana
 Nana 2
 Ping Pong

Website 
For a period, Viz offered an e-mail service called Viz Mail. In the first two weeks of service, it had 1,000 members. The service allowed users to use stationery and letterheads decorated with characters from Viz Media properties.

Despite the fact that Viz Media's licensed distribution territory includes Canada, the company has been criticized for not providing online anime simulcasts to that country.

See also 
 Crunchyroll EMEA, formerly known as Viz Media Europe

References

External links 

 
 Official VIZ Media Facebook Fan Page
 

 
1986 establishments in California
American companies established in 1986
American subsidiaries of foreign companies
Anime companies
Book publishing companies based in San Francisco
Disney comics publishers
Entertainment companies based in California
Entertainment companies established in 1986
Hitotsubashi Group
Manga distributors
Mass media companies established in 1986
Publishing companies based in the San Francisco Bay Area
Publishing companies established in 1986